James William Crawford Cumes (23 August 1922 – 21 November 2013) was an Australian author and economist and a former public servant and diplomat.

Life and career
Cumes was born in Rosewood, Queensland in August 1922. He was educated at Wooloowin State School and Brisbane Grammar School, before matriculating to the University of Queensland.

During World War II, Cumes was in the Australian Army, and fought on the Kokoda Track.

Over the course of his diplomatic career, Cumes was High Commissioner to Nigeria (1965–1967), Ambassador to Belgium (1975–1977), Ambassador to Austria and Hungary (1977–1980), and Ambassador to the Netherlands (1980–1984).

In his 1988 book A Bunch of Amateurs, Cumes critiqued the performance of Australia's foreign ministers, offering an unfavourable assessment of then Minister for Foreign Affairs and Trade Bill Hayden.

In a review of Cumes' 1990 book How to Become a Millionaire Without Really Working that appeared in The Canberra Times, Peter Bowler praised Cumes for his sunny, cheerful, sensible and interesting take on money-making.

Cumes's wife was Austrian. He moved between houses in Australia, Austria, Monaco and the South of France. He died in Vienna, Austria in November 2013 at the age of 91.

Works

Non-fiction

Fiction

References

1922 births
2013 deaths
Alumni of the London School of Economics
Ambassadors of Australia to Austria
Ambassadors of Australia to Belgium
Ambassadors of Australia to Czechoslovakia
Ambassadors of Australia to Hungary
Ambassadors of Australia to the Netherlands
High Commissioners of Australia to Nigeria
University of Queensland alumni
Australian Army personnel of World War II